Aglossosia consimilis is a moth of the  subfamily Arctiinae. It is found in the Democratic Republic of Congo, Malawi and Mozambique.

References

Moths described in 1918
Lithosiini
Moths of Sub-Saharan Africa
Lepidoptera of Mozambique
Lepidoptera of Malawi
Lepidoptera of the Democratic Republic of the Congo